Shree Ananthnagara  is a locality situated in the south of Bengaluru. It is about 3 km from the Electronic City Phase 2 and about 11 km from the Central Silk Board, and occupies a space of 800-acres.

History
It was developed in 1991. It is developed into three phases:- Ananthnagar Phase 1, Phase 2 and Vasundara Layout. It lies near Fruit Market and has many IT companies in the proximity.
It was developed for the community, where now it houses hundreds of families and commercial establishments. Many big apartment projects have come up here in the near past.

Culture

People who reside have rented their properties to many different cultures. It has a school; and a Hindu temple, Shree Ananthnagara Venkatramana Temple developed in 1997. Religious occasions and festivals are carried out gracefully, be it Ugadi (Kannada New Year), Tulasi Poojan Diwas, Navratri. It is clean and green place with tree covered cross-roads and parks.

Location
It is near APMC Market at Singena Agrahara, and comes under Hebbagodi City Municipal Council (CMC) and is within BMRDA jurisdiction. St. Francis de sales Group of Institutions is nearby . Narayana Health is 3 km away. Electronic City is about 3 km from Shree Ananthnagara. Shree Ananthnagara has three mains access roads, one directly from Hosur Highway, another one via APMC Fruit Market on Huskuru Road and the third one connecting from Chandapura- Dommasandra road.

The area is just 8 km from the new Wipro SEZ, Sarjapura Road and one can reach Sarjapura Road and Bellanduru via Huskuru village cross-roads without using the traffic-clogged city roads.

Facilities
The area has recently developed into a prominent residential hub. Many big apartment complexes are coming up here. People working in Electronic City and Bommasandra Industrial Area find Shree Ananthnagara as a preferred place to stay due to the pristine nature of this area and availability of all living amenities close by. Various shopping facilities including supermarket chains like MORE, STAR Hypermarket, Reliance Smart Point, Vishal Hyperamrket, Organic Mandya, Trendy collection, Grand Mart Hypermarket, etc. have shops and malls here. The renowned heart speciality hospital Narayana Health is situated about 4 km from this area.  Many well-known schools and tuition centers are within 2 km radius, like National Public School (NPS), Ebenezer International School, Brookefield High, Sri Chaitanya International School, St Francis De Sales Public School, EuroKids Pre-school, Jumbo-Kids Pre-school, Vidya Tuition Center etc. Many banks like Axis Bank, Andhra Bank, ICICI Bank & RBL and restaurant chains like Domino's, MDP Coffee, LJ Iyengar's, Sri Mamtha Grand, etc. have recently opened

here. A metro rail station is being constructed within walkable distance from the area as part of Namma Metro Yellow Line. Also a mall named Mahendra Millenium Mall is coming up very close to this area on Hosur road.

The Heelalige Railway station of Bengaluru Commuter rail is just about 3 km from the area. A fleet of Commuter trains pass through this station which connects people to Bangalore's other tech corridor railway stations of Carmelaram (Sarjapura Road), Bellanduru Road, Baiyyappanahalli and Hebbala. This has immensely benefited the people, who commute from this area to the other parts of Bengaluru, as they can take the Commuter service and escape the city traffic.

References

Neighbourhoods in Bangalore